Grindon is a civil parish in the district of Staffordshire Moorlands, Staffordshire, England. It contains 30 listed buildings that are recorded in the National Heritage List for England. All the listed buildings are designated at Grade II, the lowest of the three grades, which is applied to "buildings of national importance and special interest".  The parish contains the village of Grindon and is otherwise rural.  Most of the listed buildings are houses, farmhouses and farm buildings.  The other listed buildings include a church and items in the churchyard, two bridges, a former lime kiln, and an obelisk and memorial.


Buildings

References

Citations

Sources

Lists of listed buildings in Staffordshire